This is a list of listed buildings in Odense Municipality, Denmark.

''Note:: This list is incomplete. A complete list of listed buildings in Odense Municipality can be found on Danish Wikipedia.

The list

5000 Odense C

5220 Odense NV

5220 Odense SØ

5240 Odense NØ

5250 Odense SV

5260 Odense S

5270 Odense N

Delisted buildings

References

External links

 Danish Agency of Culture

 
Odense